The sixth season of Without a Trace began airing in United States on September 27, 2007. Twelve episodes had been completed before the WGA Strike. A further six episodes were produced after the end of the strike, making this the shortest season of Without a Trace at 18 episodes.

This season included a cross-over with CSI: Crime Scene Investigation involving Jack and Gil Grissom tracking a serial killer from Las Vegas to New York. This established Without a Trace as part of the same fictional universe as the tetralogy of CSI shows and Cold Case.

The sixth season of Without a Trace was not released on DVD in region 1 until May 7, 2013, but was first released in region 2 in Germany on November 20, 2009 on and in the UK on July 5, 2010.

Cast
 Anthony LaPaglia as FBI Missing Persons Unit Special Agent John Michael "Jack" Malone
 Poppy Montgomery as FBI Missing Persons Unit Special Agent Samantha "Sam" Spade
 Marianne Jean-Baptiste as FBI Missing Persons Unit Special Agent Vivian "Viv" Johnson
 Enrique Murciano as FBI Missing Persons Unit Special Agent Danny Taylor
 Roselyn Sánchez as FBI Missing Persons Unit Special Agent Elena Delgado
 Eric Close as FBI Missing Persons Unit Special Agent Martin Fitzgerald

Episodes

References

Without a Trace seasons
2007 American television seasons
2008 American television seasons